Sir Henry Hungate (1598 – c. 1648) was an English politician who sat in the House of Commons in 1625 and 1626.

Hungate was the son of William Hungate of East Bradenham, Norfolk. He was educated at St Julian's and St Albans, Hertfordshire under Mr Heyward and was admitted at Caius College, Cambridge on 28 November 1613 aged 15. He was admitted at Gray's Inn on 8 February 1615. He was knighted on 20 April 1619. In 1625, he was elected Member of Parliament for Camelford. He was elected MP for  Newport in 1626. He was of St Martin-in-the-Fields, London and was probably sequestered as a royalist. His will was proved in 1648.

References

1598 births
1648 deaths
Members of the pre-1707 English Parliament for constituencies in Cornwall
Alumni of Gonville and Caius College, Cambridge
Members of Gray's Inn
English MPs 1625
English MPs 1626